Alessandro Leopizzi (born 30 May 1980) is an Italian former footballer.

References

External links
 

Living people
1980 births
Italian footballers
Association football goalkeepers
Serie C players
Serie D players
Eccellenza players
Sportspeople from the Province of Lecce
Taranto F.C. 1927 players
S.P.A.L. players
S.S. Juve Stabia players
Footballers from Apulia